is a passenger railway station located in the city of Mimasaka, Okayama Prefecture, Japan. It is operated by the third-sector semi-public railway operator Chizu Express. The station takes its name from the famous warrior Miyamoto Musashi, who (according to one theory) was born nearby.

Lines
It is the only station in the Okayama Prefecture section of the Chizu Express where limited express trains stop, and the ``Super Hakuto that connects Keihanshin and Tottori, and the ``Super Inaba that connects Okayama City, the prefectural capital, and Tottori, also stop here. The "Victory Hakuto" train, which runs on the day of the Tottori University's second exam, also stops at this station.

Station layout
The station that has a single side platform and an island platform serving three tracks located on an embankment. There is a station building on the west side of the embankment, and a staffed ticket window, but it is possible to enter and exit the platform without going through the station building. Therefore, boarding and alighting of local trains is handled in the same way as unmanned stations, issuing a numbered ticket when boarding, and inserting the ticket and fare into the fare box inside the train when getting off. In the case of a limited express train, insert the passenger ticket/limited express ticket into the ticket box provided near the exit. This station has the Ohara depot that manages cars for local trains. Because the handling of trains is complicated, the departure and arrival platforms are not fixed, but the limited express trains generally depart from platform 2. Since the effective length of Platform 1 is short, only local trains can stop there

Platforms

Adjacent stations

History
Ōhara Station opened on December 3, 1994 with the opening of the Chizu Line.

Passenger statistics
In fiscal 2018, the station was used by an average of 92 passengers daily.

Surrounding area
Ohara-juku - Okayama Prefecture Designated Townscape Preservation District
Mimasaka City Hall Ohara General Branch
Mimasaka Municipal Ohara Junior High School
Mimasaka Municipal Ohara Elementary School
National Route 373
National Route 429

See also
List of railway stations in Japan

References

External links

 Official home page

Railway stations in Hyōgo Prefecture
Railway stations in Japan opened in 1994
Mimasaka, Okayama